Bagrat VII (1569–1619), also known as Bagrat Khan, was King of Kartli, eastern Georgia, effectively serving as a khan for the Persian shah Abbas I from 1615/1616 to 1619.

Life
A son of David XI of Kartli, he took refuge in Persia after his father was dislodged by the Ottoman invasion in 1578. He was raised at the shah’s court in Isfahan, brought up Muslim and adopted Persian customs. Later, for his efforts, he was given a fiefdom in mainland Iran. Around the mid 1590s, he assisted Farhad Khan Qaramanlu in arranging a match for Abbas I with a daughter of the Amilakhori noble family. In 1615/1616, he was installed by Abbas I as a puppet king/khan in Kartli on the deposition of his cousin, King Luarsab II the Martyr. He exercised only a limited power confined to Lower Kartli and largely relied on Persian forces. Considered as a renegade, he was disgusted by most of the kingdom’s population and, in spite of the Persian presence, he was unable to control even seemingly loyal nobility. His short reign was spent mostly in the town of Bolnisi, where he died in 1619, to be succeeded by his son, Simon II (Semayun Khan). His half-brother Khosrow was given his land in Iran.

Family
Bagrat was married to Anna, daughter of Alexander II of Kakheti. They had the following children:
 Simon II, King of Kartli.
 Pahrijan-Begum, given in marriage to Shah Abbas I.

References

Sources

External links
Bagrat VII  

1569 births
1619 deaths
People from Isfahan
Safavid appointed kings of Kartli
Shia Muslims from Georgia (country)
Bagrationi dynasty of the Kingdom of Kartli
Iranian people of Georgian descent
16th-century people of Safavid Iran
17th-century people of Safavid Iran